= Innovestment =

Innovestment GmbH
- Website type: Crowd investing
- Available in: German
- Headquarters: Berlin, Germany
- Website: innovestment.eu
- Commercial: Yes
- Launched: 2011

Innovestment GmbH is one of Berlin's first crowdfunding platforms to be established in Germany, in 2011. By the end of 2017, 40 projects had been completed and a total capital of 8 million euros brokered. Since the realignment of the company in 2019, small and medium-sized companies can raise capital on Innovestment. They develop broadly diversified investment projects with fixed terms and interest rates for private and institutional investors. Projects come from fields of sustainability, innovative growth project financing and entrepreneurship.

The company was founded in 2011 as a spin-off of RWTH Aachen University by Filipe da Costa, Daniel Appelhoff, Alexander Rajko and Norbert Töpker. Christin Friedrich joined as a managing partner in 2012 and has been CEO since 2014. Her mission is to democratize capital for real economic progress.

== See also ==
- Comparison of crowd funding services
- RWTH Aachen University
